Gail Curry is a six time English croquet champion. She is believed to be the first woman croquet player to have achieved a sextuple peel. She was editor of the Croquet Association's magazine The Croquet Gazette for six years.

References 

English croquet players
Living people
British sportswomen
Year of birth missing (living people)